Saint Francois Township is an inactive township in Wayne County, in the U.S. state of Missouri.

Saint Francois Township took its name from the St. Francis River.

References

Townships in Missouri
Townships in Wayne County, Missouri